Orange Grove was launched in 1790 at Liverpool. She made two complete voyages as a slave ship in the triangular trade in enslaved people. She became a West Indiaman, but the French Navy captured her in 1794.

Career
Orange Grove first appeared in Lloyd's Register (LR) in 1790.

1st slave voyage (1790–1791): Captain Andrew Irving sailed from Liverpool on 27 November 1790. He started acquiring slaves on 7 February 1791, first at some unknown port in the Bight of Benin, and then at Lagos, Onim. Irwin died on 2 March 1791. Orange Grove sailed from Africa on 28 May. She was under the command of Captain John K. Williams when she arrived in the West Indies. She arrived at Cartagena, Colombia on 29 July with 230 slaves. She landed some there and then sailed on to Havana where she landed the rest. She sailed for Liverpool on 24 October and arrived back at Liverpool on 8 December. She was an 's command when she arrived at Liverpool from Savannah. She had left Liverpool with 16 crew members and had suffered two crew deaths on her voyage.

2nd slave voyage (1792–1793): Captain William Carrol sailed from Liverpool on 25 February 1792. Captain Carrol died on 5 August. Orange Grove arrived at Kingston, Jamaica on 28 December with 236 slaves. She left Kingston on 1 February 1793 and arrived back at Liverpool on 30 March. She was under Captain William Lawson's command when she stopped at Beaumaris on her way home. She had left Liverpool with 25 crew members and she had suffered three crew deaths on her voyage.

Orange Grove made no more slave voyages, instead sailing as a West Indiaman.

Fate
Lloyd's List reported in September 1794 that a French squadron on its way to Guadeloupe had captured Orange Grove, Henderson, master, and that it was believed that the French had taken her there with them.

Notes

Citations

References
 

1790s ships
Age of Sail merchant ships of England
Liverpool slave ships
Captured ships